The Plaza Square Apartments Historic District, in St. Louis, Missouri, is a historic district which was listed on the National Register of Historic Places in 2007.

The district includes six 13-story Modern Movement apartment buildings and two historic churches.  The apartment buildings were constructed during 1959 to 1961 "from plans by Hellmuth Obata &
Kassabaum with Harris Armstrong." One of the churches has an office wing and/or a rectory?

One of the churches is Centenary Methodist Episcopal Church, South, which was already separately listed on the National  Register.

Location: Bounded by 15th, Olive, 17th & Chestnut Sts.
St. Louis, MO
Date added: July 12, 2007
Architect: Hellmuth, Obata & Kassabaum; et al.
Architecture: Modern Movement, Late Victorian
Historic function: Domestic; Education
Historic subfunction: Multiple Dwelling; School
Criteria: event, architecture/engineering

References

Historic districts on the National Register of Historic Places in Missouri
National Register of Historic Places in St. Louis
Modern Movement architecture in the United States
Victorian architecture in Missouri
2007 establishments in Missouri
Tourist attractions in St. Louis